The Presbyterian Church in Korea (HapDongJeongShin) is a Reformed denomination in South Korea. It subscribes the Apostles Creed and Westminster Confession. In 2004 the church had 112,275 members and 186 congregations.

References

Presbyterian denominations in South Korea
Presbyterian denominations in Asia